Matt Sutton (born 7 March 2000), is an Australian professional soccer player who plays as a goalkeeper for Melbourne City. He is the grandson of former rugby league player Brian Staunton.

Sutton is currently studying a Bachelor of Commerce at Deakin University.

References

External links

2000 births
Living people
Australian soccer players
Association football defenders
Melbourne Victory FC players
Melbourne City FC players
National Premier Leagues players
A-League Men players